Tableaux de Provence ("Pictures of Provence") is a programmatic suite composed by Paule Maurice (Sept. 29, 1910 – August 18, 1967) between 1948 and 1955 for alto saxophone and orchestra, most often performed with piano accompaniment only. The work was dedicated to French saxophone virtuoso, Marcel Mule. The movements describe the culture and scenery of Provence, southeast France, where the Mules, Paule Maurice, and her husband, composer Pierre Lantier, spent vacation time together. Tableaux de Provence was first recorded by Marcel Mule in 1957 on the Selmer release Marcel Mule, with Solange Robin on piano. It was premiered on December 9, 1958 by Jean-Marie Londeix with the Orchestre Symphonique Brestois.

Tableaux de Provence has five movements:
 Farandoulo di chatouno / Farandole des jeunes filles (Farandole of the young girls)
 Cansoun per ma mio  / Chanson pour ma mie (Song for my love)
 La boumiano / La bohémienne (The Bohemian woman, or The Gypsy)
 Dis alyscamps l'amo souspire / Des alyscamps l'âme soupire (A Sigh on the soul for the    Alyscamps)
 Lou cabridan / Le cabridan (The Bumblebee)

The fourth movement, Dis alyscamps l'amo souspire, is said to have been written first, as Maurice was mourning the death of her husband’s cousin.

References 
 Tableaux de Provence for saxophone and piano, Paule Maurice. (Lemoine) Sheet music ASIN: B000JJJDYG
 A Comprehensive Guide to the Saxophone Repertoire, 1844-2003 by Jean-Marie Londeix
 Jean-Marie Londeix: Master of the Modern Saxophone by James Umble
 The Cambridge Companion to the Saxophone by Richard Ingham
 Marcel Mule, His Life, and the Saxophone by Eugene Rousseau
 Sax, Mule & Co by Jean-Pierre Thiollet

External links 
 http://www.paulemaurice.com
 http://studentsofpaulemaurice.ning.com/notes/Jean-Marie_Londeix
 http://www.studentsofpaulemaurice.ning.com
 http://studentsofpaulemaurice.ning.com/xn/detail/3127800:Note:363?xg_source=activity

Compositions for saxophone
1955 compositions